Ingenius can refer to the following:

 Ingenius, the mythical British king.
 InGenius, a now-defunct newsfeed service for personal computers, previously known as X*Press X*Change.

nl:Ingenius